Väinö Järvenpää (born 25 September 1933) is a Finnish boxer. He competed in the men's lightweight event at the 1960 Summer Olympics.

References

External links
 

1933 births
Living people
Finnish male boxers
Olympic boxers of Finland
Boxers at the 1960 Summer Olympics
People from Ii
Lightweight boxers
Sportspeople from North Ostrobothnia